Catholic may refer to:

Christian denominations

 The Catholic Church, the largest Christian Church
 The Latin Church, also known as the Roman Catholic Church or Western Catholic Church
 The Eastern Catholic Churches, several Eastern Churches in full communion with Catholic Church
 Independent Catholicism, Churches that historically and culturally stem from Catholicism but broke away from the Catholic Church
 The Old Catholic Church, part of Independent Catholicism
 The Philippine Independent Church
 Other churches expressing apostolic origins and traditions of catholicity, such as:
 The Eastern Orthodox Church
 Oriental Orthodoxy
 The Assyrian Church of the East
 The Ancient Church of the East
 The Anglican Church

Terminology
 Catholic (term), an overview of the use of the term in the Four Marks of the Church (one, holy, catholic, and apostolic) of the Nicene Creed
 Catholicity, the core set of beliefs common to several Catholic denominations

Other uses
 Catholic (album), an album by Gavin Friday
 Catholics (novel), a 1972 novel by Brian Moore
 Catholics (film), a 1973 film directed by Jack Gold, based on the novel

See also
 Roman Catholic (term)
 Roman Catholic Church (disambiguation)
 Catholic Church (disambiguation)
 Catholicism (disambiguation)